Damaskatika is a settlement on the island of Othonoi, Greece. At Damaskatika is the Orthodox church of Saint Paraskevi and the Old Mill. Damaskatika is 1.2 km from Fyki Bay and 3,8 km from Ammos.

References

Populated places in Corfu (regional unit)
Villages in Greece